Pemba Doma Sherpa (7 July 1970 – 22 May 2007) was the first Nepalese female mountaineer to climb Mount Everest via its north face, was the second Nepali woman to summit from both the north and south faces, and is one of six women to have summited Everest twice.  She was the leader of the 2002 Nepalese Woman Everest Expedition.
Pemba Doma Sherpa climbed Cho Oyu from the Tibetan side on 28 Sep 2005.

A resident of Namche-1 of Solukhumbu district, Pemba Doma had been raised by her grandparents after her parents died when she was two.  She attended classes in one of the schools built by Edmund Hillary.  She was the founder of the Save the Himalayan Kingdom charity, which focused on educating Nepali children regardless of caste.  She was also the director of the Climb High Himalaya trekking company.

Pemba Doma fell from an elevation of 8000 metres while descending Lhotse. The fall was witnessed by Australian mountaineer Philip Ling who was also climbing the mountain.  Two other Sherpas also perished while trailing a group of clients during a snowstorm.

Everest summits
2000
2002

See also
List of Mount Everest summiters by number of times to the summit
List of Mount Everest records
Lhakpa Sherpa
Ming Kipa

Notes and references 

1970 births
2007 deaths
People from Solukhumbu District
Nepalese mountain climbers
Nepalese summiters of Mount Everest
Sherpa summiters of Mount Everest
Mountaineering deaths
Sport deaths in Nepal
Nepalese Buddhists
Nepalese female mountain climbers